Jazmyne Rey Avant (born January 30, 1990) is an American soccer defender who last played for the Houston Dash of the National Women's Soccer League (NWSL).

Early life

University of Florida 
Avant accepted an athletic scholarship to attend the University of Florida, where she played for coach Becky Burleigh's Florida Gators women's soccer team from 2008 to 2011.  She was a standout defender for the Gators, playing a total of 97 matches and adding 12 assists. She was also part of the United States U20 player pool in 2009 as well as the U16's in 2006.

Playing career

Club
Avant spent time with Sky Blue FC on a tour of Japan in early 2012 before signing with the New York Fury in the WPSL Elite for the 2012 season.

On February 20, 2013 Avant was signed as a discovery player for the Portland Thorns in the NWSL. She was waived in June 2013 and picked up by the Boston Breakers later that month. On July 24, 2014 Boston Breakers announced that Avant has been waived.

References

External links
 Boston Breakers player profile
 New York Fury player profile
 University of Florida player profile
 US Soccer player profile

1990 births
Living people
American women's soccer players
Florida Gators women's soccer players
New York Fury players
Portland Thorns FC players
Soccer players from Dallas
National Women's Soccer League players
Boston Breakers players
Women's association football defenders
Houston Dash players
African-American women's soccer players
People from Coppell, Texas
21st-century African-American sportspeople
21st-century African-American women